Linda Bailey (born 1948) is a Canadian author who has written dozens of books for children, including Mary Who Wrote Frankenstein, and the Stevie Diamond mystery series.

Early life and education 
Bailey was born in 1948 and grew up in Winnipeg. She enjoyed reading from an early age and cites public libraries and a bookmobile in Winnipeg as her largest influences, saying of the bookmobile, "It was parked two hours a week on a corner near my house and gave me my first experience of the joy of reading."

As a young adult, Bailey briefly lived in Melbourne, Australia before returning to Canada. She studied English at the University of British Columbia, where she earned both a Bachelor's and a master's degree. She is the mother of prominent evolutionary ecologist Tess Grainger.

Literary career 
In 1992, Bailey published her first book, How Come the Best Clues are Always in the Garbage?, the first installment in the Stevie Diamond mystery series. The story follows Stephanie, a sixth-grade girl from Vancouver who investigates the theft of money from her mother's charity project. Bailey published a total of seven books in the series between 1992 and 2002.

In addition to the Stevie Diamond books, Bailey is also the author of the middle-grade series "Good Times Travel Agency," which follows the adventures of the time-travelling Binkerton family on their trips through history.

Bailey has published almost 40 books over the course of her career.

Awards 
Mary Who Wrote Frankenstein was listed as a Best Book of the Year by Booklist, Publishers Weekly, the New York Public Library, and The Globe and Mail, among others.

Under-the-Bed Fred was shortlisted for a Chocolate Lily Award in 2018.

Bailey has also received the Red Cedar Award, the Blue Spruce Award, the Hackmatack Award, the Christie Harris Award, the California Young Reader Medal, the Silver Birch Award, and the Georgia Storybook Award. She twice won the Shining Willow Award and the Arthur Ellis Award, and earned the B.C. Chocolate Lily Award five times.

In 2021, Bailey earned the Vicky Metcalf Award for Literature for Young People by the Writers' Trust of Canada.

Bibliography

Stevie Diamond series 

 How Come the Best Clues are Always in the Garbage? (1992)
 How Can I Be a Detective if I Have to Baby-sit? (1993)
 Who's Got Gertie? And How Can We Get Her Back? (1994)
 How Can a Frozen Detective Stay Hot on the Trail? (1996)
 What's a Daring Detective Like Me Doing in the Doghouse? (1997)
 How Can a Brilliant Detective Shine in the Dark? (1999)
 What is a Serious Detective Like Me Doing in Such a Silly Movie? (2002)

Good Times Travel Agency series 

 Adventures in Ancient Egypt (2000)
 Adventures in the Middle Ages (2000)
 Adventures with the Vikings (2001)
 Adventures in Ancient Greece (2002)
 Adventures in Ancient China (2003)
 Adventures in the Ice Age (2004)
 On the Run in Ancient China (2019)

Other works 

 Petula, Who Wouldn't Take a Bath (1996)
 Gordon Loggins and the Three Bears (1997)
 When Addie Was Scared (1999)
 The Best Figure Skater in the Whole Wide World (2001)
 Stanley's Party (2003)
 Stanley's Wild Ride (2006)
 The Farm Team (2006)
 Goodnight, Sweet Pig (2007)
 Seven Dead Pirates (2015)
 When Santa Was a Baby (2015, with Geneviève Godbout)
 If You Happen to Have a Dinosaur (2017, with Colin Jack)
 Mary Who Wrote Frankenstein (2018)
 Under-the-Bed Fred (2017)
 The Tiny Hero of Ferny Creek Library (2017)
 Princesses Versus Dinosaurs (2020)
 Carson Crosses Canada (2020, with Kass Reich)
 Arthur Who Wrote Sherlock (2022)
 Cinderella-with Dogs! (2023)

References

Living people
1948 births
Canadian children's writers
Writers from Winnipeg
University of British Columbia alumni
20th-century Canadian women writers
21st-century Canadian women writers